Afrânio Pompílio Gastos do Amaral (1 December 1894 in Belém – 29 November 1982 in São Paulo) was a Brazilian herpetologist.

As a youngster, he collected snakes for Augusto Emilio Goeldi (1859-1917). He studied medicine in Salvador, Bahia, later finding employment at the Instituto Butantan in São Paulo. Here, his work involved research and production of anti-venom serum. In 1921 he succeeded Vital Brazil (1865-1950) as director of the Instituto Butantan. During his career, he was the author of over 450 published works.

Taxa
Amaral was the taxonomic authority of several herpetological genera (e.g., Mastigodryas, Anotosaura, Colobodactylus) and of around 40 new species (Listing of species described by Amaral at French Wikipedia).

The following species are named in his honor:
Gymnodactylus amarali 
Caaeteboia amarali 
Mastigodryas amarali 

Also, the following subspecies is named in his honor:
Boa constrictor amarali

Selected works
"A general consideration of snake poisoning and observations on neotropical pit-vipers", 1925.
"South American snakes in the collection of the United States National Museum", 1925.
"Animaes venenosos do Brasil", 1930.
"Animais veneniferos, venenos e antivenenos", 1945.
"Linguagem científica", 1976.
"Serpentes do Brasil: iconografia colorida" [Brazilian snakes: a color iconography], 1977.

References

1894 births
1982 deaths
Brazilian herpetologists
People from Belém
20th-century Brazilian zoologists